The Río Blanco (Bolivia) is a river of Bolivia.

See also
List of rivers of Bolivia

References
Rand McNally, The New International Atlas, 1993.

Rivers of Beni Department
Rivers of Santa Cruz Department (Bolivia)
Ramsar sites in Bolivia